Pavetta schumanniana, the poison bride's bush, is a species of plant described by F.Hoffm. and Karl Moritz Schumann. Pavetta schumanniana is part of the genus Pavetta and the family Rubiaceae. No subspecies are listed in the Catalog of Life.

References 

schumanniana